Sofya Lansere and Kamilla Rakhimova were the defending champions but chose not to participate.

Valentini Grammatikopoulou and Ekaterina Yashina won the title, defeating Anna Kubareva and Maria Timofeeva in the final, 6–3, 7–5.

Seeds

Draw

Draw

References

External Links
Main Draw

Meitar Open - Doubles